John Halvar Theofron Lindgren (8 November 1899 – 30 January 1990) was a Swedish cross-country skier who won the 1927 world titles in the 18 km and 50 km events. He finished eighth in the 50 km race at the 1932 Winter Olympics. His younger brother Ivan was also an Olympic cross-country skier.

Cross-country skiing results
All results are sourced from the International Ski Federation (FIS).

Olympic Games

World Championships
 2 medals – (2 gold)

References

External links

1899 births
1990 deaths
People from Lycksele Municipality
Cross-country skiers from Västerbotten County
Swedish male cross-country skiers
Olympic cross-country skiers of Sweden
Cross-country skiers at the 1932 Winter Olympics
Vasaloppet winners
FIS Nordic World Ski Championships medalists in cross-country skiing
IFK Umeå skiers
Lycksele IF skiers